The coefficient of haze (also known as smoke shade) is a measurement of visibility interference in the atmosphere.

One way to measure this is to draw about 1000 cubic feet of air sample through an air filter and obtain the radiation intensity through the filter. The coefficient is then calculated based on the absorbance formula

References

Further reading 
 
 

Visibility